The 2017 Open Sopra Steria de Lyon was a professional tennis tournament played on clay courts. It was the 2nd edition of the tournament which was part of the 2017 ATP Challenger Tour. It took place in Lyon, France, between 12 and 18 June 2017.

Singles main-draw entrants

Seeds

 1 Rankings are as of 29 May 2017.

Other entrants
The following players received wildcards into the singles main draw:
  Félix Auger-Aliassime
  Maxime Janvier
  Corentin Moutet
  Alexandre Müller

The following players received entry from the qualifying draw:
  Maxime Chazal
  Tristan Lamasine
  Hugo Nys
  Jürgen Zopp

Champions

Singles

 Félix Auger-Aliassime def.  Mathias Bourgue 6–4, 6–1.

Doubles

 Sander Gillé /  Joran Vliegen def.  Gero Kretschmer /  Alexander Satschko 6–7(2–7), 7–6(7–2), [14–12].

External links
Official Website

2017 ATP Challenger Tour
Open Sopra Steria de Lyon
2017 in French tennis